Amata Catherine Coleman Radewagen  (born December 29, 1947), commonly called Aumua Amata , is an American Samoan politician who is the current delegate for the United States House of Representatives from American Samoa. Radewagen, a Republican, was elected on November 4, 2014, after defeating Democratic incumbent Eni Faleomavaega; she was the first ever Republican delegate since the office had been created in 1970 and began her tenure on January 3, 2015. She also serves as the national committeewoman for the Republican Party of American Samoa. Amata is the first woman to represent American Samoa in the U.S. Congress.

By winning 75.4% of the vote in her 2016 reelection, Aumua Amata attained the highest number of votes in American Samoa history. She won reelection with 83.3 percent of the votes in a three-way race in 2018.

She has been the scheduling director for the United States House of Representatives majority leadership for eight years. Radewagen has been the most senior member of the Republican National Committee since 2012. She was a member of both the executive committee for the 2016–17 presidential transition and the executive committee for the 2017 Republican National Committee Chairman's Transition Committee.

Early life and education
Radewagen is the daughter of Peter Tali Coleman, the first popularly elected Governor of American Samoa, and Nora Stewart Coleman, the former First Lady of American Samoa. Her father was Samoan, while her mother was of Chinese, German, Native Hawaiian, and Scottish descent. Radewagen has twelve siblings. She attended school for girls in Honolulu (Sacred Hearts Academy) before she in 1975 received a bachelor's in psychology from the University of Guam. She had classes at Loyola Marymount University in Los Angeles, California and at George Mason University in Fairfax, Virginia.

She is married to Fred Radewagen, and they have three children (Erika, Mark, and Kirsten), and two grandchildren.

Radewagen holds the orator (talking chief) title of Aumua from the capital of Pago Pago, which is her hometown and where she is a registered voter.

From 1984 to 1997, Amata was the chief diplomatic correspondent for the Washington Pacific Report.

Political career
Aumua Amata has been an executive assistant to the first Delegate-at-Large from American Samoa.

From 1997 to 1999, Radewagen served on the staff of United States Representative Phil Crane of Illinois. She served on the staff of United States Representative J.C. Watts, Jr. of Oklahoma from 1999 to 2003. After that, she served on the staff of the House Republican Conference from 2003 to 2005. From 1999 to 2005, she served as staff on the House Republican Conference. Radewagen first ran for Congress in the 1994 elections against Democrat Eni F.H. Faleomavaega. She failed to gain the nomination of the Republican Party of American Samoa in 1996 and 2000, and she ran as an independent in the 1998 elections.

Radewagen was appointed in 2001, by President George W. Bush, as a Commissioner on the President's Advisory Commission on Asian Americans and Pacific Islanders (AAPI); she chaired the Community Security Committee. Radewagen was the only Pacific Islander on the 15-member commission.

Since 1994, Radewagen has participated in every federal election. Since 1986, she represents the American Samoa Republican Party in the Republican National Committee. Radewagen is the most senior member.

In 2019, she was reappointed by President Donald Trump to serve on the President's Advisory Commission for Asian Americans and Pacific Islanders, in what would be her second time on the commission since first being appointed by President Bush in 2001.

United States House of Representatives

2014 election

Radewagen ran for American Samoa's at-large congressional district in the 2014 elections. She defeated the Democratic incumbent Delegate Eni Faleomavaega, 42% to 31%; former Democratic Governor Togiola Tulafono finished third at 11% in the nine-way contest.

2016 election

Radewagen was re-elected in 2016, receiving the highest number of votes in American Samoa history for any elective office, winning 75.4% of the vote cast.

Tenure
Radewagen assumed office on January 3, 2015. Upon taking office, she became the Republican Party's highest-ranking Asian Pacific federal officeholder in the United States.

Radewagen has a bipartisan track record, ranked the 28th and 14th most bipartisan Representative in the 114th and 115th United States Congresses, respectively, by The Lugar Center and McCourt School of Public Policy's Bipartisan Index.

Committee assignments
 Committee on Natural Resources
 Subcommittee on Oversight and Investigations
 Subcommittee on Indian, Insular and Alaska Native Affairs
 Committee on Small Business (Vice Ranking Member)
 Subcommittee on Health and Technology (chair)
 Subcommittee on Economic Growth, Tax and Capital Access
 Committee on Veterans' Affairs
 Subcommittee on Economic Opportunity

Caucus memberships
 Congressional Western Caucus
 Climate Solutions Caucus

Election results

Other activity
Radewagen has been involved in helping build democratic institutions internationally. As a trainer since 1992, she has participated in missions to Kazakhstan, Cambodia, Kyrgyzstan, and Morocco for the International Republican Institute and the International Foundation for Electoral Systems, among other activities. She began advocating on behalf of breast cancer awareness after being diagnosed with breast cancer in 1993.

She is a founding member of the American Samoa Society and a life member of the Capitol Hill Club. She has also been a member of organizations such as Guam Society of America, Hawaii State Society, Women's Foreign Policy Group, and the Independent Women's Forum. She is a current member of the Pan Pacific and Southeast Asia Women's Association. In 2003, Radewagen became the first Pacific Islander chosen as “Outstanding Woman of the Year” by the National Association of Professional Asian American Women (NAPAW). In 2008, she received the International Leadership Foundation's Visionary Award. In 2013, she received both the Inspirational Speaker Award at the Samoan Athletes Heart of Champions Ceremony in La Mesa, CA, as well as the Trailblazer Award from the Republican National Convention. She is a current board member at the Field House 100 American Samoa.

See also
 List of Asian Americans and Pacific Islands Americans in the United States Congress
 Women in the United States House of Representatives
 Republican Party of American Samoa

References

External links
 U.S. Representative Aumua Amata official U.S. House website

 

|-

Living people
1947 births
Delegates to the United States House of Representatives from American Samoa
Female members of the United States House of Representatives
Republican National Committee members
Republican Party members of the United States House of Representatives from American Samoa
American Samoa Republicans
American Samoan Roman Catholics
American Samoan women in politics
20th-century American politicians
20th-century American women politicians
21st-century American politicians
21st-century American women politicians
University of Guam alumni
American Samoan people of Chinese descent
American Samoan people of German descent
American Samoan people of Native Hawaiian descent
American Samoan people of Scottish descent
Native Hawaiian people
People from Pago Pago
Candidates in the 1994 United States elections
Candidates in the 1996 United States elections
Candidates in the 1998 United States elections
Candidates in the 2000 United States elections
Candidates in the 2002 United States elections
Candidates in the 2004 United States elections
Candidates in the 2006 United States elections
Candidates in the 2008 United States elections
Candidates in the 2010 United States elections
Candidates in the 2012 United States elections
Asian conservatism in the United States